Piano Trio No. 1 may refer to:
 Piano Trio No. 1 (Arensky)
 Piano Trio No. 1 (Beethoven)
 Piano Trio No. 1 (Brahms)
 Piano Trio No. 1 (Dvořák)
 Piano Trio No. 1 (Mendelssohn)
 Piano Trio No. 1 (Mozart)
 Piano Trio No. 1 (Schubert)
 Piano Trio No. 1 (Schumann)
 Piano Trio No. 1 (Shostakovich)